WINY (1350 AM) is a heritage radio station that transmits in AM stereo on 1350 kHz and is owned by Gary and Karen Osbrey through licensee Osbrey Broadcasting Company. It operates during the daytime with 5,000 watts of power, and at 79 watts nighttime. Its studios and transmitter are located in Putnam, Connecticut.

WINY first signed on the air on May 3, 1953, under the call letters WPCT. The station was financed by three French Canadian businessmen from Central Falls, Rhode Island: named Goyette, Albert Lanthier, and Rene Cote. The station was managed by Daniel Hyland with an original announcing staff of Dick Alarie, Ed Read, and Frank Carroll.

The call letters were changed to WINY in September 1960 when the station was purchased by the Herbert C. Rice family and the Winny Broadcasting Company. The call letters were changed to represent the station's new mascot, "Winny, The Community Gal", who was a counterpart to the mascot at sister station WILI, "Willie, The Community Man". The family combined the operations of the two stations into Nutmeg Broadcasting Company, which would go on to own a total of five radio stations throughout Connecticut, including WNTY in Southington, WLIS in Old Saybrook, and WILI and WILI-FM in Willimantic.

WINY changed hands in 1990 to the Gerardi Broadcasting Corporation, and once more in 2001 to the current owners, the Osbrey Broadcasting Company.

In addition to its original programming, WINY is also a member station of the Boston Red Sox Radio Network, the New England Patriots Radio Network, and the Motor Racing Network.

Translators

External links
 WINY official website

INY
Mainstream adult contemporary radio stations in the United States
Radio stations established in 1953
Windham County, Connecticut
Putnam, Connecticut
1953 establishments in Connecticut